The British School in the Netherlands (BSN) is an IB-classified group of private schools situated in The Hague area. Four campuses together form one school: BSN Senior School Voorschoten, BSN Junior School Leidschenveen, BSN Junior School Vlaskamp and opened up in September 2018: Senior School Leidschenveen. Over 2100 students from nearly 90 nationalities are enrolled.

The school is open to students from 3 to 18 years of age and also offers daycare for 0-3s and after-school care on its Junior School Leidschenveen campus through Zein International Childcare.

The schools all follow the English curriculum, which means that students take GCSEs in Years 10 and 11 (age 15 and 16), entering the Sixth Form in Years 12 and 13 (age 17 and 18) where students may choose to take examinations in either British A-Levels or the IB Diploma Programme.

The School was founded in The Hague in 1931 by Gwen Brunton-Jones, under the name of "The English School". It has continued to grow and has since become Europe's largest international school, with students from nearly 90 nationalities.

Schools
The British School in the Netherlands is currently arranged across 4 sites, based in and around The Hague and Voorschoten. The two Junior Schools accommodate children from 3 to 11, while the Senior Schools are for children from 11 to 18.

Junior School Leidschenveen

Junior School Leidschenveen is a campus in the Leidschenveen area of The Hague, providing 470  places for children aged 3 to 11 years. It was opened in 2010 by Princess Maxima. The campus includes facilities for out-of-school care, a daycare centre for 0- to 3-year-olds and a sports and community centre. The current Headteacher is Karren van Zoest.

Junior School Vlaskamp

Junior School Vlaskamp provides accommodation for approximately 500 children aged 3 to 11. This award-winning building was opened in 1997. The current Headteacher is Claire Waller.

Senior School Voorschoten

Situated in Voorschoten, just outside The Hague, the BSN Senior School has a capacity for up to 1,100 students worldwide. The Senior School has sports fields, hockey pitches and tennis courts. The classrooms include specialist areas such as design and technology; ICT; food technology; art and music; and the three sciences. Students can study French, German, Dutch, Spanish, Chinese and other languages as part of the native speaker programme. There is a library and resources area, a school hall with stage and professional theatrical lighting, a cafeteria and a sports hall. The current Headteacher is Patrick Heuff.

Senior School Leidschenveen

The British school in the Netherlands have opened a new senior school in the same location as the Junior school in Leidschenveen, operating similarly to their other secondary school. The current Headteacher is James Oxlade.

School organisation
The BSN is a non for profit organisation entirely dependent on fee income and receives no subsidy from either the Dutch or British governments. The school is managed by a Board of Management chaired by the CEO, Heath Monk, and composed of senior managers within the school’s teaching and support staff. This board is answerable to the Board of Governors, which is responsible for strategic supervision and, in turn, reports to the School Association.

History
The school was founded in The Hague in 1931 by a New Zealander, Gwen Brunton-Jones, and was called The English School. There were four teachers and about 20 pupils who were accommodated in a school on the van Diepenburchstraat. The school closed in 1940 with the invasion of the Netherlands and was re-opened in 1948 by Nancy Macdona, a previous staff member. Two rooms were rented in the Jan van Nassaustraat: 12 pupils and 4 teachers formed the foundations of the present British School.

By 1952 numbers had reached 60 and new premises were found on the Adriaan Goekooplaan. Expansion continued, and Ms Macdona recruited a co-principal, Phyllis Donaldson, to take responsibility for the growing number of older children. In 1953 there was another move to Doornstraat, and then in 1954, the School was merged with the American and French Schools as part of the International School project. This turned out to be a catastrophe, and the school soon withdrew from it. That meant that with about 80 children and half a dozen teachers, they had no premises. The chaplain of the Anglo-American Church allowed them to move into his church hall on the Riouwstraat, where they remained until 1959. In that year, at last, the school bought its own property, ‘Duinroos’, on the Tapijtweg.

With expansion continuing, a Senior Division was opened in 1966 in Parkweg and, four years later, a Middle Division in van Stolklaan. By 1972 the School had grown to over 500 pupils. The Senior Division broadened the programme of studies on offer. It began to enjoy significant success at Advanced Level with the result that more and more pupils stayed on into the Sixth Form after O-levels, instead of returning to boarding school in the UK. The school was renamed The British School in the Netherlands in 1976.

Two years later, the Senior School moved to Voorschoten, into purpose-built premises opened by the Duke of Gloucester. The Junior School remained at Tapijtweg, and the Infant School had to move to rented classrooms in a Dutch school in Leidschendam.  By now, the school had taken over the management of a small ‘dépendance’ in the northern town of Assen where many English-speaking Shell families lived.

Although the school was called The British School, it had an international pupil population of children from 50 different countries. In 1985, the provision for Teaching English as a Second Language was extended to the Senior School, and the BSN was now able to accept children of twelve and thirteen years of age who were unable to speak English on arrival and successfully take them through GCSE and A-level examinations. This further increased numbers, and by the late 1980s, there were over 1200 pupils within the whole school. In 1990, a large piece of farmland with an 18th-century farmhouse adjacent to the Senior School was purchased. This made possible the addition of two sports fields, a cricket pitch, tennis courts, a dance/drama studio and a home for the Principal. Prinses Margriet opened a new Science, Technology and Music Building in 1992.

In September 1997, a new, award-winning Junior School building opened its doors to 700 children aged 3 to 11 years of age. The completion of this building allowed the BSN to combine the Nursery, Infant and Junior Schools on one site in The Hague. The new school was officially opened by Prins Willem Alexander in November 1997.

The notion of bringing these three schools together permanently on one site was not to last, however. The popularity of the new Junior School, along with the buoyant Dutch economy, led to a significant increase in pupil numbers in The Hague and two major new developments were embarked upon: firstly, in July 1999, a three-storey school building just a couple of minutes’ walk from the Junior School, was purchased and, after extensive refurbishment, became a new Foundation School, which opened in September 1999. The second development was in 2003 when the opportunity arose to take over an unused Dutch school on the Diamanthorst nearby, making it possible to have two separate Junior Schools.

Meanwhile, the Senior School in Voorschoten was having its own problems with space, and some very difficult decisions needed to be confronted. The new Science, Technology and Music block was only seven years old, but in order to put the Senior School in a position where it could truly keep up with the projected growth of the future, Trevor Rowell, the Principal, and the school board took the decision that an entirely new Senior School needed to be built. And so in June 2001 work started on this project. The new buildings were opened by Queen Beatrix in October 2003.

Following the opening of the new Senior School, the BSN continued to keep its eyes open for future expansion and managed to acquire a large plot of land in the new Leidschenveen area of The Hague where it opened a new campus in January 2010, together with Day Care for the 0–3s and After School Care.

In the more recent past, a new iPad 1-to-1 program was introduced with mixed opinions across the board. Also, the school continues to support a 'student council' and an environmental committee which has built a large garden to win the 'Green flag' award.

Notable alumni
Myles Allen, Professor at the University of Oxford
Konrad Bartelski, former British ski racer, attended the BSN between 1960 and 1972
Anna Bentley, Olympic fencer and 3 times national champion, left the BSN in 1999
Jonathan Brittain, playwright and director, attended the BSN from 2000 to 2005
Victoria Hollins, BBC London journalist, attended the BSN between 1989 and 1991
Joseph O' Neill, novelist and non-fiction writer, attended the BSN from 1970 to 1981
Robert Senior, CEO of Saatchi and Saatchi, attended the BSN from 1977 to 1981
Anna Walker, English television presenter, attended the BSN from 1979 to 1981
Briony Monroe, actress, attended the BSN from 2001 to 2008

References

Joseph Brannan 1966 to 1970

External links

 Official website

Schools in The Hague
International schools in the Netherlands
International Baccalaureate schools in the Netherlands
1931 establishments in the Netherlands
Educational institutions established in 1931
Netherlands
Voorschoten